2006 is an album released in 2004 by Manfred Mann with Manfred Mann’s Earth Band. Manfred Mann preferred to point out that this is rather his solo album. His explanation for this is given in the sleeve notes, where he says that some of the tracks ('Mars', 'Two Friends', 'Two Brides', ' Slave', 'Frog' and 'Get Me Out of This') were recorded in a more unrehearsed and experimental way than the others. Because of this, Mann preferred to present this outside the normal Earth Band context, as representative only of his personal tastes and not those of his Earth Band colleagues. He also remarks that the album title is not consistent with its release year (2004, or in some places 2005) because the resulting anachronism seems to him artistically interesting.

Track listing

Personnel 
Manfred Mann – keyboards, vocals
Mick Rogers – guitars
Geoff Dunn – drums
Steve Kinch – bass
Noel McCalla – vocals
with
Chris Thompson – vocals
Thomas D – vocals
Matt Loffstadt – guitars
Don Freeman – poem and talking
Barbara Thompson – saxophone
Dean Hart – bass, guitars, vocals
Hazel Hernandez – vocals
Melanie Pappenheim – vocals
Arte Chorale – vocals
Henry’s Eight – vocals

Notes

Manfred Mann's Earth Band albums
2004 albums